Michel Boudrias (born 1977) is a Canadian politician who served as the Member of Parliament (MP) for the riding of Terrebonne in the House of Commons of Canada from 2015 to 2021. He was first elected in the 2015 election as a member of the Bloc Québécois. On February 28, 2018, however, Boudrias, along with six other Bloc MPs, resigned from the Bloc's caucus to sit as an independent MP citing conflicts with the leadership style of Martine Ouellet. Following Ouellet's resignation, he rejoined the party on June 6, 2018. Boudrias was not re-nominated by the Bloc for the 2021 election and ran as an Independent. He was defeated by Bloc candidate Nathalie Sinclair-Desgagné.

Boudrias served in Afghanistan in 2010–11 as part of the Royal 22nd Regiment. He is also a recipient of the Queen's Diamond Jubilee Medal.

Electoral record

References

Living people
Members of the House of Commons of Canada from Quebec
Bloc Québécois MPs
Canadian military personnel of the War in Afghanistan (2001–2021)
Canadian Army officers
People from Roberval, Quebec
21st-century Canadian politicians
1977 births
Québec debout MPs
Politicians from Montreal
Royal 22nd Regiment officers